Frederick Ponsonby, 3rd Earl of Bessborough  (24 January 1758 – 3 February 1844), styled the Viscount Duncannon from 1758 to 1793, was an Anglo-Irish peer.

Background
Ponsonby was the eldest son of Viscount Duncannon (who succeeded as the 2nd Earl of Bessborough in July 1758) and Lady Caroline Cavendish, daughter of The 3rd Duke of Devonshire. He succeeded to his father's titles in 1793. He was educated at Christ Church, Oxford, and obtained the degrees of Master of Arts and Doctor of Civil Law.

As Viscount Duncannon, he sat in the House of Commons as member for Knaresborough from 1780 until his succession to his father's earldom. He was a Lord of the Admiralty in 1782–83.

Marriage and issue
On 27 November 1780, Duncannon married the intelligent and kind Lady Henrietta Spencer, second daughter of John Spencer, 1st Earl Spencer. Duncannon and Harriet had four children:

 John Ponsonby, 4th Earl of Bessborough (1781–1847); married Lady Maria Fane (daughter of John Fane, 10th Earl of Westmorland) on 16 November 1805. They had 14 children. 
 Major General Sir Frederick Cavendish Ponsonby (1783–1837); married Lady Emily Bathurst (daughter Henry Bathurst, 3rd Earl Bathurst), on 16 March 1825. They had six children.
 Lady Caroline Lamb (1785–1828); married 2nd Viscount Melbourne, the Prime Minister in 1805. They had two children. 
 William Francis Spencer, 1st Baron de Mauley (1787–1855); married Lady Barbara Ashley-Cooper (the only daughter and heir of Anthony Ashley-Cooper, 5th Earl of Shaftesbury) on 8 August 1814. They had three children.

The marriage was notoriously unhappy. Tired of Duncannon's vacillating abusive temper, and craving for love in her life, Harriet started a disastrous affair with Richard Brinsley Sheridan. This affair was indeed disastrous for Harriet, as the worst-case scenario actually happened: the abusive Duncannon walked in on Harriet and Sheridan having intercourse. Violently enraged, Duncannon immediately wanted to divorce Harriet. Divorce in the 18th century was social ruin for women, and Harriet narrowly escaped such calamity only when Duncannon's father William Ponsonby, 2nd Earl of Bessborough and the powerful Cavendish clan sided with Harriet, making divorcing her social suicide.

Perhaps chastened by time and age, by 1820 Duncannon rather miraculously ceased his abuse, and he and Harriet eventually settled into a companionable marriage.

In 1821, Harriet died suddenly of a "chill" caught while travelling in Italy. Duncannon was heartbroken by her death. He outlived her by more than 20 years, dying at Canford House, Dorset, in 1844.

Character
Duncannon usually made a favourable first impression: quiet, but with "the most mild and amiable manner". On the other hand, he was a notoriously cruel husband, fluctuating between sweet or obsessive attentiveness, neglecting Harriet entirely, or physically abusing her. His abuse of his wife was so public his family could not keep up appearances by pretending it was not occurring. In 1791 Harriet's serious illness gave rise to rumours, apparently quite unfounded, that he was trying to kill her.

Like most of the Ton (le bon ton), Duncannon was a gambling addict. When he would lose, he would erupt into rages that terrified his wife. Duncannon's abuse and his gambling rages made Harriet's family fearful for her safety. Their fears were often proven, as when he threatened violence if Harriet did not hand over her marriage settlement to him after losing an especially ruinous gambling round. Luckily for the terrified Harriet, her kind brother George Spencer, 2nd Earl Spencer swept in and protected her from immediate violence by quietly giving Duncannon the money.

References

External links

1758 births
1844 deaths
Ponsonby family
Lords of the Admiralty
Members of the Parliament of Great Britain for English constituencies
British MPs 1780–1784
British MPs 1784–1790
British MPs 1790–1796
Frederick 03